Raa Raa is a 2011 Tamil romantic comedy film written and directed by Sandilya, starring Udhaya and Shweta Basu Prasad, in her Tamil film debut, in lead roles. The title refers to the Royapuram and Royapettah, two areas in Chennai. The film was launched in December 2010, and released on 7 October 2011 to mixed reviews.

Plot
The story revolves around Bharathi (Udhaya) and his family, consisting of his father, mother, sister, brother, and sister-in-law. Saravanan, a rich cloth merchant, is very particular that the Thirukural is recited regularly within his home, and whenever Bharathi wants to please his father, he recites a kural or two and proves an exemplary son, even though he is up to his youthful antics the rest of the time. In all, it is a happy existence.

Into this scenario comes love in the form of Gayathri (Shweta Basu Prasad), whom Bharathi sights on the road one day, carrying a veena and hurrying to a college cultural, in a two-wheeler, with a Brahmin priest. Bharathi falls for her and assumes that she is from his community and that there will be no opposition at home for marriage. When Gayathri comes home and sees the lifestyle and sacred atmosphere in Bharathi's household, she is worried.

Bharathi and his family like her immensely and now want to meet her parents to fix the wedding. However, the truth is that she hails from an entirely different background, that of a Royapuram family, with her brother Dhana (Adithya Menon) being a rowdy who hacks down people left and right. What is more, her family’s large mansion is in the middle of a fishing township, while she herself was sent into a city hostel to continue her education. The two families are as different as chalk and cheese.

When Bharathi learns of this, he is disturbed, but his love wins, and he decides to find a way out for marriage. He decides to embark on a strange plan. He persuades Dhana and his family to masquerade as Brahmins, and after much effort, even manages to teach them several Kurals to please his father. Everything is smooth-sailing when the two families meet at Bharathi’s home, but when Saravanan wants to go to the girl’s house for the engagement ceremony, Dhana is in a fix. How can he invite them to Royapuram and the settlement of huts reeking of fish and surrounded with his rowdy gang? He decides to hire a house in Mylapore and lend himself some credibility in the eyes of Saravanan.

All is going according to Bharathi’s plan when a blast from the past steps in. An enemy of Saravanan wants to destroy him, and, in the process, reveal the secret that Bharathi has been keeping from his family.

Cast
 Udhaya as Bharathi
 Shweta Basu Prasad as Gayathri
 Ponvannan as Shivashankaran
 Adithya Menon as Dhana
 Suzane George as Pushpa
 Meera Krishnan
 Sathyan Sivakumar
 Nandha Periyasamy

Soundtrack
The music was composed by Srikanth Deva.

References

2011 romantic comedy films
2011 films
2010s Tamil-language films
Films scored by Srikanth Deva
Indian romantic comedy films